Jhonatan Marcelo Candia Hernández (born 15 March 1995) is an Uruguayan professional footballer who plays as a forward for Rosario Central.

Professional career
Candia made his professional debut with Liverpool Montevideo in a 1-1 Uruguayan Primera División tie with Central Español on 6 April 2013.

International career
Candia represented the Uruguay U20s in 2014.

Honours
Liverpool Montevideo;
 Uruguayan Segunda División: 2014-15

References

External links
 
 

1995 births
Living people
Footballers from Montevideo
Uruguayan footballers
Uruguayan expatriate footballers
Uruguay youth international footballers
Association football forwards
Liverpool F.C. (Montevideo) players
Arsenal de Sarandí footballers
Club Atlético Huracán footballers
Rosario Central footballers
Uruguayan Primera División players
Uruguayan Segunda División players
Argentine Primera División players
Uruguayan expatriate sportspeople in Argentina
Expatriate footballers in Argentina